Taprobanelmis carinata, is a species of riffle beetle found in Sri Lanka.

Adults beetles are found on the stones in the cascade.

References 

Elmidae
Insects of Sri Lanka
Insects described in 1973